Paul Offner (August 7, 1942April 20, 2004) was an American economist, educator, public health expert, and Democratic politician.

Biography
Born in Bennington, Vermont, Offner was raised in Italy. Offner graduated from Amherst College in 1964. He received an M.P.A. from the Woodrow Wilson School of Public and International Affairs at Princeton University in 1966 and a Ph.D. in economics from Princeton University in 1970 after completing a doctoral dissertation titled "Labor force participation in the ghetto: a study of New York City poverty areas." In 1974, Offner was elected to the Wisconsin State Assembly from La Crosse, Wisconsin. Then in 1976, he was elected to the Wisconsin State Senate serving until 1984. After his legislative service, Offner worked in Ohio in public health. Then he worked for Daniel Patrick Moynihan as a legislative aide. Finally  he worked for the Washington, D.C., government, was a professor at Georgetown University, and worked at the Urban Institute.

Works

References

1942 births
2004 deaths
People from Bennington, Vermont
Politicians from La Crosse, Wisconsin
People from Washington, D.C.
Amherst College alumni
Princeton University alumni
Georgetown University faculty
Democratic Party members of the Wisconsin State Assembly
Democratic Party Wisconsin state senators
20th-century American politicians